The Lincolnshire Standard was a weekly newspaper published in Boston, England, attached to Lincolnshire Standard Ltd.

Founded in the 19th century, it is now published under the title Boston Standard. Its sister titles include the Sleaford Standard, Skegness Standard, Grantham Journal and Horncastle News.

On 26 March 1958 the Boston Guardian, which was established in 1854, merged with the Lincolnshire Standard.

Lincolnshire Standard officially ceased publication on 28 March 1958.
This is misleading as the Lincolnshire Standard continued to be published into the 1970[s at least.

References

Defunct newspapers published in the United Kingdom
19th-century establishments in England
Mass media in Lincolnshire
Boston, Lincolnshire